This article features the 1993 UEFA European Under-18 Championship qualifying stage. Matches were played 1992 through 1993. Two qualifying rounds were organised and seven teams qualified for the main tournament, joining host England.

Round 1

Group 1-9, 12

|}

Group 10

Group 11

Group 13
All matches were played in Luxembourg.

Group 14

Round 2

|}

See also
 1993 UEFA European Under-18 Championship

External links
Results by RSSSF

UEFA European Under-19 Championship qualification
Qual